The 2021–22 Women's EHF Champions League knockout stage began on 26 March with the playoffs and ended on 5 June 2022 with the final at the MVM Dome in Budapest, Hungary, to decide the winners of the 2021–22 Women's EHF Champions League. A total of twelve teams competed in the knockout phase.

Format
In the playoffs, the eight teams ranked third to sixth in Groups A and B play against each other in two-legged home-and-away matches. The four winning teams advanced to the quarterfinals, where they were joined by the top-two teams of Groups A and B for another round of two-legged home-and-away matches. The four quarterfinal winners qualified for the final four tournament at the MVM Dome in Budapest, Hungary.

Qualified teams
The top six teams from Groups A and B qualified for the knockout stage.

Playoffs

Overview

|}

All times are UTC+2 (matches on 26 March are UTC+1).

Matches

RK Krim Mercator won 55–52 on aggregate.

Metz Handball won 62–41 on aggregate.

Brest Bretagne Handball won 53–51 on aggregate.

Quarterfinals

Overview

|}

Matches

Team Esbjerg won 53–52 on aggregate.

Győri Audi ETO KC won 56–44 on aggregate.

Vipers Kristiansand won 65–49 on aggregate.

Final four
The final four was held at the MVM Dome in Budapest, Hungary on 4 and 5 June 2022. The draw took place on 10 May 2022.

Bracket

Semifinals

Third place game

Final

Notes

References

External links
Official website

knockout stage